Wood Hall, also known as Milton Hall and Oak Hall, is a historic home located at Callaghan, Alleghany County, Virginia. It was built in 1874, and is a double-pile, two-story, brick house on a stuccoed brick foundation in the Gothic Revival style. It features a two-story, gable roof entrance tower with clasping buttresses and pointed-arch openings.  Also on the property is a former caretaker's cottage.  It was built for William Wentworth-FitzWilliam, Viscount Milton, whose wife, Lady Laura Milton, brought him from Britain to Alleghany County for his health.

It was added to the National Register of Historic Places in 1982.

References

Houses on the National Register of Historic Places in Virginia
Gothic Revival architecture in Virginia
Houses completed in 1874
Houses in Alleghany County, Virginia
National Register of Historic Places in Alleghany County, Virginia